Sarmeydan may refer to:
 Sarmeydan, Isfahan